Economic System which described by Quran..

Economic system of Quran (Islam)..

Abu Hayyan Saeed

The economic system described in Al-Quran e Kareem is very clear.There are many verses about the economic system of Islam.I understood these verses easily.

Surah Al-Baqrah ,Verse # 3

ٱلَّذِينَ يُؤْمِنُونَ بِٱلْغَيْبِ وَيُقِيمُونَ ٱلصَّلَوٰةَ وَمِمَّا رَزَقْنَـٰهُمْ يُنفِقُونَ ٣

Translation:

who believe in the Divine Message( Wahi) , establish system, and spend wealth excess  from what We have provided for them,

— Dr. Mustafa Khattab, the Clear Quran

Surah Al-Baqrah , Verse # 215

يَسْـَٔلُونَكَ مَاذَا يُنفِقُونَ ۖ قُلْ مَآ أَنفَقْتُم مِّنْ خَيْرٍۢ فَلِلْوَٰلِدَيْنِ وَٱلْأَقْرَبِينَ وَٱلْيَتَـٰمَىٰ وَٱلْمَسَـٰكِينِ وَٱبْنِ ٱلسَّبِيلِ ۗ وَمَا تَفْعَلُوا۟ مِنْ خَيْرٍۢ فَإِنَّ ٱللَّهَ بِهِۦ عَلِيمٌۭ ٢١٥

Translation:

They ask you ˹O Prophet in˺ what ˹way˺ they should spend wealth ?. Say, “Whatever wealth you give are for parents,close relatives, orphans, the poor, and ˹needy˺ people. Whatever good you do is certainly well known to Allah.”

— Dr. Mustafa Khattab, the Clear Quran

Surah Al-Baqrah ,Verse # 254

يَـٰٓأَيُّهَا ٱلَّذِينَ ءَامَنُوٓا۟ أَنفِقُوا۟ مِمَّا رَزَقْنَـٰكُم مِّن قَبْلِ أَن يَأْتِىَ يَوْمٌۭ لَّا بَيْعٌۭ فِيهِ وَلَا خُلَّةٌۭ وَلَا شَفَـٰعَةٌۭ ۗ وَٱلْكَـٰفِرُونَ هُمُ ٱلظَّـٰلِمُونَ .

Translation:

O believers! Spend from what We have provided for you before the arrival of the Day of judgment when there will be no bargaining,1 friendship,2 or intercession. Those who disbelieve are ˹truly˺ the wrongdoers.

— Dr. Mustafa Khattab, the Clear Quran

Surah Al-Baqrah Verse # 261

مَّثَلُ ٱلَّذِينَ يُنفِقُونَ أَمْوَٰلَهُمْ فِى سَبِيلِ ٱللَّهِ كَمَثَلِ حَبَّةٍ أَنۢبَتَتْ سَبْعَ سَنَابِلَ فِى كُلِّ سُنۢبُلَةٍۢ مِّا۟ئَةُ حَبَّةٍۢ ۗ وَٱللَّهُ يُضَـٰعِفُ لِمَن يَشَآءُ ۗ وَٱللَّهُ وَٰسِعٌ عَلِيمٌ 

Translation:

The example of those who spend their wealth in the cause of Allah (to help needy people and welfare deeds) is that of a grain that sprouts into seven ears, each bearing one hundred grains. And Allah multiplies ˹the reward even more˺ to whoever He wills. For Allah is All-Bountiful, All-Knowing.

— Dr. Mustafa Khattab, the Clear Quran

Surah Al-Baqrah Verse # 262

ٱلَّذِينَ يُنفِقُونَ أَمْوَٰلَهُمْ فِى سَبِيلِ ٱللَّهِ ثُمَّ لَا يُتْبِعُونَ مَآ أَنفَقُوا۟ مَنًّۭا وَلَآ أَذًۭى ۙ لَّهُمْ أَجْرُهُمْ عِندَ رَبِّهِمْ وَلَا خَوْفٌ عَلَيْهِمْ وَلَا هُمْ يَحْزَنُونَ .

Translation:

Those who spend their wealth in the cause of Allah (for needy people and welfare deeds ) and do not follow their charity with reminders of their generosity or hurtful words—they will get their reward from their Lord, and there will be no fear for them, nor will they grieve.

Surah Aal-e-Imran ,Verse # 92

لَن تَنَالُوا۟ ٱلْبِرَّ حَتَّىٰ تُنفِقُوا۟ مِمَّا تُحِبُّونَ ۚ وَمَا تُنفِقُوا۟ مِن شَىْءٍۢ فَإِنَّ ٱللَّهَ بِهِۦ عَلِيمٌۭ 

Translation:

You will never achieve righteousness until you spend some of what you cherish. And whatever you give is certainly well known to Allah.

Surah Al-Anfaal ,Verse # 41

۞ وَٱعْلَمُوٓا۟ أَنَّمَا غَنِمْتُم مِّن شَىْءٍۢ فَأَنَّ لِلَّهِ خُمُسَهُۥ وَلِلرَّسُولِ وَلِذِى ٱلْقُرْبَىٰ وَٱلْيَتَـٰمَىٰ وَٱلْمَسَـٰكِينِ وَٱبْنِ ٱلسَّبِيلِ إِن كُنتُمْ ءَامَنتُم بِٱللَّهِ وَمَآ أَنزَلْنَا عَلَىٰ عَبْدِنَا يَوْمَ ٱلْفُرْقَانِ يَوْمَ ٱلْتَقَى ٱلْجَمْعَانِ ۗ وَٱللَّهُ عَلَىٰ كُلِّ شَىْءٍۢ قَدِيرٌ ٤١

Translation:

Know that whatever you earn, one-fifth is for Allah and the Messenger i.e poor close relatives, orphans, the poors, and ˹needy˺ people, if you ˹truly˺ believe in Allah and what We revealed to Our Prophet(Abd) on that decisive day when the two armies met ˹the day of Conquest’. And Allah is Most Capable of everything.

— Dr. Mustafa Khattab, the Clear Quran

There is a clear cut indication to spend at least 20% of our income for needy people as per listed.

Economic System of Islam is a book written by Sayyid Abul Ala Maududi, noted for his rejection of capitalism as un-Islamic.

External links
 Economic System of Islam

Books by Sayyid Abul Ala Maududi